The canton of Alès-2 is an administrative division of the Gard department, southern France. It was created at the French canton reorganisation which came into effect in March 2015. Its seat is in Alès.

It consists of the following communes:
 
Alès (partly)
Belvézet
Bouquet
Brouzet-lès-Alès
Fons-sur-Lussan
Lussan
Mons
Les Plans
Saint-Just-et-Vacquières
Saint-Martin-de-Valgalgues
Saint-Privat-des-Vieux
Salindres
Servas
Seynes
Vallérargues

References

Cantons of Gard